John Mark Makwata is a Kenyan born footballer player who plays for ZESCO United F.C. in the Zambia Super League, and also the Kenyan national team Harambee Stars; he is known for his signature free kicks.

Nairobi City Stars  FC

He was recruited while playing for Kenyan JMJ Academy, in his early days; he played as a midfielder before the then Nairobi City Stars coach Jan Koops converted him into a striker. He spent three seasons with the Nairobi-based outfit before he was snapped up by Ulinzi Stars Fc. During his departure, Jan Koops described him as an integral part of the team whose effect would be missed. He left Nairobi City Stars together with Boniface Onyango with whom they had a blossoming partnership that yielded five goals.

Ulinzi Stars Fc

On 24 October 2013, he joined Kenyan Premier League Side Ulinzi Stars F.C., that is when his attacking flair and thirst for goal was discovered. At first, he was deployed as a midfielder but was later moved upfront where he thrived during his second season with the Nakuru-based outfit. During the 2015 season, he finished as the second runners-up with fourteen goals from twenty-six matches only eight shy of the top scorer Jesse Were and five shy of Michael Olunga who finished as the runners-up.
By the first half of 2016, Makwata was the runners-up to Wycliffe Ochomo who pipped him to the top spot by only a goal whilst having played three more matches than Makwata, Makwata had ten goals from eleven matches while Ochomo had eleven goals from fourteen appearances.
His Ulinzi coach Robert Matano was once quoted saying that Makwata was a humble, obedient and a very good forward. Makwata finished the 2016 Kenya Premier League season as the top Scorer.

Buildcon Fc
In 2017, March Makwatta joined Zambian side Buildcon Fc.

International career
Makwata made his international debut on 29 May 2016 at Moi International Stadium Kasarani coming in as a substitute for Ayub Timbe in the 82’ minute, the match ended on a 1-1 draw

Personal life
He graduated from the Kenya Defense Forces recruits’ training school in Eldoret after 7 months of basic military training on 28 May 2014.

Honours
Personal achievements
Sport journalist association Kenya (SJAK) player of the month April 2015.

Goal.com Kenya player of the week on 5 October 2015.

Soka Player of the month

References

External links
 http://www.soka.co.ke/tag/soka_fans_player_of_the_month
 
 http://www.soka.co.ke/tag/john_mark_makwatta
http://www.fostats.com/player/10650/

1995 births
Living people
Kenyan Luhya people
Kenyan footballers
Kenya international footballers
Association football forwards
Nairobi City Stars players
Buildcon F.C. players